Bhanumati Devi (15 May 1934 – 4 January 2013) was a Burmese-born Indian film and theater actress.

Devi was born in British Burma on 15 May 1934. She moved to Puri, Odisha, India, with her Indian family following World War II.

Devi began acting in the theater in 1942 when she was just seven years old. Some of her best reviewed stage roles were in Lakhye Hira and Napahu Rati Namaru Pati’. Devi appeared at the Annapurna Theatre in Cuttack for more than forty years.

She made her film debut in 1954 in Amari Gann Jhia when she was nineteen years old. She was especially active in the Cinema of Odisha during the 1950s and 1960s. Devi's was cast in a lead role in more than a dozen Indian films. Some of her most prominent roles include her character, Harabou, in the 1966 Odia film, Matira Manisha, for which she won a National Film Award. Her last film was Jaydeb, which was released in 1986.

Devi was awarded the Sangeet Natak Akademi Award from the Sangeet Natak Akademi in 1985. In 2005, she received the Jaydev Award for Lifetime Achievement at the Odisha State Film Awards.

Bhanumati Devi died at her home on Red Cross Road in Puri, Odisha, India, on 4 January 2013, at the age of 78.

References

External links

1934 births
2013 deaths
Indian film actresses
Indian stage actresses
Recipients of the Sangeet Natak Akademi Award
Burmese emigrants to India
People from Puri
Burmese people of Indian descent
Actresses in Odia cinema
20th-century Indian actresses
20th-century Burmese actresses
Burmese film actresses
Burmese stage actresses